Cancosa is a Chilean commune. It is a highland in Aymara town in the Tarapacá Region. Cancosa is slightly on the slopes of the Sillajhuay volcano, near the border by Bolivia. According to the Chile National Archive the town was founded by the Moscoso, Challapa, Ticuna and Mamani families. Its inhabitants live from agriculture, llama and alpaca livestock, as well as tourism and handicrafts.

There are also four minefields that, in compliance with the Ottawa treaty, must be removed before 2020, by the state of Chile.

Reference 

Populated places in Tarapacá Region
Communes of Chile